Asquini is a surname. Notable people with the surname include:

Fabio Asquini (1726–1818), Italian rural economist and agronomist
Fabio Maria Asquini (1802–1878), Italian Roman Catholic Cardinal
Giuseppe Asquini (1901–1987), Italian politician
Joe Asquini (1925–1990), Canadian football player
Robyn Asquini (1988–), Canadian Artist